Vikram Sakhalkar is an Indian film and television actor and model. He made his television debut with Zee TV's Jamai Raja. He is best known for portraying Dr. Kabir Kapoor in Colors TV's medical romantic drama Savitri Devi College & Hospital.

Personal life 
Vikram was born on 23 April 1986, to a family of business background. He completed schooling in Arya Vidhya Mandir, Juhu, Mumbai, and graduation thereafter. As soon as he passed his school, his family moved to the US and completed his college there. Currently he is unmarried.

Career
He started his career as model, has done extensive modeling and has been featured in many advertisements like oats, gold deo, Brittania biscuits, cement, Raymonds and many more.
He was part of a song, by Bombay Bicycle Club.

He made his film debut as one of the leads in 2015 film Calendar Girls and as supporting role in 2018 film Vodka Diaries. His television debut was in the recurring role of Dhawal in Jamai Raja. Since 2017-18 he has been portraying the parellal lead role of Dr. Kabir in Savitri Devi College & Hospital television series.

Filmography

Television

References

External links

1985 births
Living people
Indian male models
Indian male television actors
21st-century Indian male actors